Dietmannsried is a municipality in the district of Oberallgäu in Bavaria in Germany.

Sister cities
  Carry-le-Rouet, Bouches-du-Rhône, France

References

Oberallgäu